John Fraser may refer to:

Politics
John Simon Frederick Fraser (1765–1803), commanded the Fraser Fencibles in Ireland and was (M.P.) for Inverness-shire
John James Fraser (1829–1896), 5th Premier of the Canadian province of New Brunswick, 1878–1882
John A. Fraser (politician) (1840–1908), political figure in Nova Scotia
John G. Fraser (1840–1927), Orange Free State politician
John Fraser (Ontario MP) (1849–1928), Canadian Member of Parliament for Lambton East, Ontario
John Fraser (British Columbia politician) (1866–1960), Canadian Member of Parliament from British Columbia, 1925–1935
Sir Malcolm Fraser, 1st Baronet (John Malcolm Fraser, 1878–1949), British newspaper editor and political agent
John Malcolm Fraser (1930–2015), 22nd Prime Minister of Australia, 1975–1983
John Allen Fraser (born 1931), Speaker of the Canadian House of Commons, 1986–1993
John Fraser (British politician) (1934–2017), British Member of Parliament for Norwood
John Fraser (Ontario MPP) (born 1958), Canadian politician elected to the Ontario legislature for Ottawa South in 2013

Sports
John Fraser (footballer, born 1876) (1876–1952), Scottish footballer, Southampton player and Dundee manager
John Fraser (Canadian soccer) (1881–1959), Canadian soccer player and member of the 1904 Olympic Games Canadian Team
John Fraser (tennis) (born 1935), Australian tennis player of the 1950s and 60s
John Fraser (footballer, born 1936), Scottish footballer for Hibernian
John Fraser (footballer, born 1938) (1938–2011), Northern Ireland footballer for Sunderland and Watford
John Fraser (footballer, born 1953), English footballer for Fulham
John Fraser (footballer, born 1978), Scottish footballer whose clubs include Ross County, Clyde and Forfar Athletic

Academia
John Fraser (botanist) (1750–1811), Scottish botanist
John Fraser (academic) (c. 1823–1878), president of Pennsylvania State University, 1866–1868
John Fraser (Celticist) (1882–1945), Jesus Professor of Celtic at the University of Oxford
John Fraser (journalist) (born 1944), Canadian journalist and master of Massey College, University of Toronto

Others
 John Fraser (died 1306), Scottish independence fighter, brother of Simon Fraser
John Fraser (bishop) (died 1507), Bishop of Ross, Scotland
John Fraser (frontiersman) (1721–1773), colonial Pennsylvanian fur trader and soldier
John Fraser (British Army officer, born 1760) (1760–1843)
John Fraser (poet) (c. 1809–1849), Irish poet
John Fraser (architect) (1825–1906), American architect
John Fraser (ethnologist) (1834–1904), Australian ethnologist
John Arthur Fraser (1838–1898), British artist, photography entrepreneur and teacher
John Fraser (businessman) (1843–1907), Scottish businessman who partnered with David Chalmers Neave to co-found Fraser and Neave
Sir John Foster Fraser (1868–1936), British Parliamentary correspondent and travel writer
John Fraser (auditor), Auditor General of Canada, 1905–1919
John Fraser (surgeon) (1885–1947), principal of the University of Edinburgh, 1944–1948
John R. Fraser (1890–1959), Canadian physician
John Fraser (minister) (1894–1985), Moderator of the General Assembly of the Church of Scotland, 1958–1959
John Fraser (British Army officer, born 1896) (1896–1943), British recipient of the George Cross
John Fraser (critic) (born 1928), English/Canadian author, literary theorist, and cultural analyst
John Fraser (film producer) (1930–2010), Australian film producer and cinema executive
John Fraser (actor) (1931–2020), Scottish actor
John MacLeod Fraser (1935–2010), former Canadian ambassador to China
John Fraser (novelist, poet) (born 1939), English professor, novelist, and poet
John A. Fraser (businessman) (born 1951), Australian businessman
John Fraser (physician), Scottish physician
John Fraser, musician in the James Wright Group

Other uses
John B. Fraser, a steamship lost on Lake Nipissing, Ontario

See also
Jack Fraser (disambiguation)
John Frazer (disambiguation)